Ephedra rhytidosperma, synonym Ephedra lepidosperma, common name li jiang ma huang, is a shrub native to North-central China, Inner Mongolia and Mongolia. It grows in mountainous areas at an elevation of 2300–4200 m.

References

Medicinal plants of Asia
Plants used in traditional Chinese medicine
Flora of North-Central China
Flora of Inner Mongolia
Flora of Mongolia
rhytidosperma